Desperate Housewives is an American television comedy drama-mystery that premiered on October 3, 2004 on ABC. Seasons one through eight have been released on DVD in Regions 1, 2, 3, 4 and 5.

Desperate Housewives follows the lives of four women–Susan (Teri Hatcher), Lynette (Felicity Huffman), Bree (Marcia Cross) and Gabrielle (Eva Longoria)–through the eyes of Mary Alice (Brenda Strong), their deceased friend and neighbor.

The vast majority of the episodes are titled after lyrics by composer/lyricist Stephen Sondheim. Episodes were broadcast on Sunday nights at 9/8c.

Series overview

Episodes

Season 1 (2004–05)

Season 2 (2005–06)

Season 3 (2006–07)

Season 4 (2007–08)

Season 5 (2008–09)

Season 6 (2009–10)

Season 7 (2010–11)

Season 8 (2011–12)

Specials

Ratings

References

External links
 

 
Desperate Housewives

it:Desperate Housewives#Episodi